Love-stricken (in Persian:دل‌شدگان;) is a 1992 Iranian historical drama film directed by Ali Hatami. The movie is mainly about some Iranian classical musicians in Ghajar era and their struggle to release their first Record which takes them on a journey to France. The film uses many notable Iranian actors and actresses. Among them are: Amin Tarokh, Akbar Abdi, Saeed Poursamimi, Mohamad Ali Keshavarz, Jamshid Hashempour, Hamid Jebelli, Fathali Oveisi, Shahla Riahi, Leili Rashidi, Leila Hatami, and Anna Borkowska.

Love-stricken is in celebration and praise of Iranian music. At the beginning of the film an intertitle is seen which says: "This film is dedicated to The Great Masters of Iranian Music in the millennium anniversary of Barbad". The film music was composed by famous Iranian musicians such as Hussein Alizadeh as composer and Mohammad Reza Shajarian as singer. Love-stricken was 13th film of Ali Hatami after some both commercial and artistic successes of his previous films like: Mother, Sooteh-Delan, Sattar Khan, Hajji Washington and Kamalolmolk.

Title 
According to Dehkhoda dictionary, the word "Del Shodegan" is the plural form of "Delshodeh". In Persian it means "the lovelorn" or "worried" people. "love-stricken" or "love-struck" is another translation.

Plot 

His imperial majesty Ahmad Shah Qajar asks a group of Iranian musicians, unaffiliated with the royal court, to record a sample of Persian Classical Music on newly invented gramophone at the Conservatoire de Paris. A group of best musicians gather under the direction of Maestro Delnavaz. A singer named Taher (Amin Tarokh) also accompanies them to the journey to Paris.

They can record several gramophone discs after a lot of troubles. Taher who has fallen in love with a blind Turkish princess dies of an illness. As the others decide to come back to Iran, one of them says he wants to stay in Europe and learn "scientific music". Other members return to Iran with broken hearts, their friend's corpse and some recorded gramophone discs of Iranian treasure.

Cast 

Faramarz Sadighi as Maestro Delnavaz
Amin Tarokh as Taher Khan Bahr-eh Nour
Akbar Abdi as Agha Faraj Boulsik
Jamshid Hashempur as Iran's Ambassador to France
Shahla Riahi as Delnavaz's Wife
Saeed Poursamimi as Naser-Khan Deylaman
Mohamad Ali Keshavarz as Mirza Mahmoud
Hamid Jebeli as Khosro Khan Rahabi
Leila Hatami as Leila
Leili Rashidi as Agha Faraj's Wife
Anna Borkowska as Madam
Saeed Amir Soleymani as Nayeb Al-saltaneh
Jalal Moghadam as Eesa-khan-e Vazir
Rogheyeh Chehreh-Azad as Dayeh
Turan Mehrzad as Naser Khan's Wife
Mehri Vadadian as Faraj's Mother
Soroor Nejatollahi as Khosor Khan's Wife
Hooshang Beheshti as Haj Agha Monfared Nabatriz
Ali Asghar Garmsiri as Ostad Yousef
Babak Eskandari as Ahmad Shah
Elmira Abdi as Agha Faraj Daughter
Foad Chavmeh as Taher's Childhood
Rashid Aslani as Afandi

Production
Ali Hatami wrote about 4 hours of script for Love-stricken. Although all of the script was shot, but they had to edit it to a normal 90 minutes film. the actual film was shot in 19 acts, but Hatami cut out about 10 acts of it in the editing room.

Music

Music of the film is composed by Hossein Alizadeh (tar), Saeed Farajpouri (kamancheh), Arshad Tahmasebi (tar) and Dariush Zargari (santur). Mohammad Reza Shajarian is the lead singer of the score. Although at first Hatami wanted Hossein Dehlavi to cooperate with Alizadeh but Dehlavi thought it would be better if Alizadeh worked on the tracks alne. For the lyrics different poems of Hafiz, Fereydun Moshiri and Ali Hatami was used. 
ٰThe soundtrack is dedicated to The Great Masters of Iranian Music in the millennium anniversary of Barbad.

Track listing

Other personnel 
Aziz Sa'ati – still photographer
Morteza Momayez – title
Abdollah Eskandari  – makeup artist
Ali Hatami – art direction
Ali Hatami – costume design
Ahmad Bakhshi – assistant director
Noor Mohammad Najjari – assistant director
Hassan Yektapanah – assistant director

Awards and nominations 
Love-stricken was nominated in three categories in 1992 Fajr Film Festival as follows: 
Best Sound Recorder
Best Sound Mix
Best Music
It was also nominated in 2001 Three Continents Festival for "best film".

See also 
Barbad
Ali Hatami
Iranian music
Iranian traditional music

References

External links
Delshodegan in IMDb
Golchehre – A song by Mohammad Reza Shajarian in YouTube

1990s historical drama films
1992 films
Films about music and musicians
Films directed by Ali Hatami
Films set in Paris
Films set in Tehran
Iranian historical drama films
1990s Persian-language films
1992 drama films